This is a list of football clubs in Suriname.

Teams are listed according to the league in which they currently play.

SVB Eerste Divisie (2016/17)
Botopasi (Botopasi)
Inter Moengotapoe (Moengo)
PVV (Paramaribo)
SNL (Paramaribo)
Leo Victor (Paramaribo)
Nishan 42 (Meerzorg)
Notch (Moengo)
Robinhood (Paramaribo)
 Jong Rambaan (Lelydorp)
Transvaal (Paramaribo)
Voorwaarts (Paramaribo)
Walking Boyz Company (Paramaribo)

Source:

SVB Tweede Divisie (2016/17) 

ACoconut (Brokopondo)
 Bomastar (Lelydorp)
 Caravan (Livorno)
Flora (Paramaribo)
Papatam (Albina)
T.O.K. FC (Paramaribo)
Santos (Nieuw Nickerie)
Slee Juniors FC 
Tahitie (Brownsweg)
West United (Totness)

SVB Derde Divisie (2016/17)

Regio Midden
 Bintang Baru
 Flamingo
 FTN
 Parana
 Real Leiding
 SCV
 SV Sunny Point
 SVW

Regio Noord
 Broki
 Jong Aurora
 Paraguay
 Sophia

Regio Oost
 Tamansari
 Happy Boys
 SK. Commewijne
 K. Commewijne
 Real Bergi
 High School
 Super Adjoema
 Compleet

Regio West
 Inter Boskamp
 Groningen
 Real Coronie
 Jai Hanuman
 De Ster
 Coronie Boys
 Bintang Merah football team
 Vitesse

Regio Zuid
 Tramos
 kitha
 OSV
 Ghana

Former Surinamese league teams 
 Olympia (of Paramaribo, founded in 1919) were the first official champions of Suriname in 1923 having won a total of 2 national titles. 
 Ajax (of Paramaribo, founded in 1921) won 3 national titles before the club folded in the sixties.
 Fearless  (of Moengo, founded in 1925) won the district championship on several occasions prior to dissolution.
 MYOB (of Paramaribo, founded in 1927) was renamed Remo in 1950. 
 Cicerone (of Paramaribo, founded in 1929) won 4 national titles before ceasing operations.
 NAKS (of Paramaribo, founded in 1949) is now a social and cultural organisation.
 Deva Boys and FCS Nacional merged to form the Nacional Deva Boys in 2013.

References

 
Suriname
Football clubs
clubs